Denise Donna Nicholas (born July 12, 1944) is an American actress. Nicholas played high-school guidance counselor Liz McIntyre on the ABC comedy-drama series Room 222 and Councilwoman Harriet DeLong on the NBC/CBS drama series In the Heat of the Night.

Biography

Early life and education
Nicholas was born in Detroit to Louise and Otto Nicholas. Nicholas spent her early years in Detroit. With the remarriage of her mother to Robert Burgen, she moved to Milan, Michigan, a small town south of Ann Arbor. At the age of 16, Nicholas appeared on the August 25, 1960, cover of Jet magazine as a future school teacher prospect at the National High School Institute at Northwestern University. She graduated from Milan High School in 1961. Nicholas is the middle child of three, with an older brother, Otto, and a younger sister, Michele, who was murdered in 1980.

Nicholas entered the University of Michigan as a Pre-Law student. Nicholas then switched her major to Latin-American politics, Spanish, and English before dropping out after her second  completed academic year. Nicholas moved to New York City, and worked for the J. Walter Thompson (JWT) advertising firm. She subsequently transferred to Tulane University, where she majored in Fine Arts. Her acting debut was in a Spanish-language play presented by her language class. Nicholas dropped out of Tulane University as well, this time  to join the Free Southern Theater (FST), during the Civil Rights Movement. After spending two years touring the deep South with the FST, Nicholas went to New York City and joined the Negro Ensemble Company, working in all productions during the first season of that theatre ensemble. From the stage of the St. Mark's Playhouse in New York, Nicholas was cast as Liz McIntyre, the Guidance Counselor on ABC series Room 222. Nicholas received her Bachelor of Arts in Drama from the University of Southern California Theater Program in 1987, after living in Southern California for a number of years.

Career
Nicholas began her television acting career in 1968, with an episode of It Takes a Thief. Nicholas had three consecutive (1970–1972) Golden Globe nominations for Best Actress in a Drama TV Series, for her role as Liz McIntyre on the ABC comedy-drama series Room 222. Following Room 222 (1969–1974), she won two Image Awards in 1976 for Outstanding Actress in a Motion Picture and Outstanding Actress in a Drama Series, for her role as Beth Foster in Let's Do It Again (1975). Nicholas also played Olivia Ellis on Baby... I'm Back!, a sitcom that aired on CBS in 1978

Nicholas wrote the song "Can We Pretend," which her then-husband Bill Withers recorded on his 1974 album +'Justments. Nicholas later appeared as Harriet DeLong in the cast of NBC/CBS' In the Heat of the Night (1989–1995). Nicholas wrote six episodes of the series, beginning her second career as a writer. When that show was cancelled, she enrolled in the Professional Writing Program at the University of Southern California, eventually finding her way to the Journeymen's Writing Workshop under the tutelage of author Janet Fitch. She worked with Fitch for five years. Nicholas also attended the Squaw Valley Community of Writers Workshop, and the Natalie Goldberg Workshop, in Taos, New Mexico.

Nicholas first novel, Freshwater Road, was published by Agate Publishing, in August 2005. it received a starred review in Publishers Weekly and was selected as one of the best books of 2005 by The Washington Post, The Detroit Free Press, The Atlanta Journal-Constitution, Newsday and the Chicago Tribune. The novel won the Zora Neale Hurston/Richard Wright Award for debut fiction in 2006, as well as the American Library Association's Black Caucus Award for debut fiction the same year. Freshwater Road was reprinted by Pocket Books. Brown University commissioned Nicholas to write a staged adaptation of Freshwater Road, which was presented in May 2008. Nicholas is currently completing her memoir, and it will be published by Agate Publishing in 2023.

Personal life
At 19, Nicholas dropped out of the University of Michigan and signed up with the Free Southern Theater in New Orleans, headed by Gilbert Moses, whom she married in May 1964 at the American Theater in New York, and divorced in 1967. 

Nicholas married soul singer-songwriter Bill Withers on January 17, 1973. Their relationship had been volatile prior to their nuptials. In November 1972, Nicholas told authorities that Withers flew to Tucson, Arizona, where she was filming The Soul of Nigger Charley, and assaulted her in a motel room after she threatened to end their relationship, but she refused to press charges. She filed for divorce in April 1974, and their divorce was finalized in December 1974. 

In February 1980, Nicholas's younger sister Michele Burgen, a 26-year-old editor for Ebony magazine, was shot to death. Her body was found in a locked rental car at LaGuardia Airport in New York City. Nicholas and her older brother Otto searched the country for clues, but no suspect was ever taken to trial.

While coping with the loss of her sister, Nicholas met CBS sports anchor Jim Hill at a Sacramento poetry reading in June 1980. They married on Valentine's Day in 1981. The couple separated in October 1981 and she filed for divorce, before reconciling soon after. Nicholas filed for divorce again in 1984. The divorce was final in 1987.

Acting credits

Films
Blacula (1972) as Michelle
The Soul of Nigger Charley (1973) as Elena
Mr. Ricco (1975) as Irene Mapes
Let's Do It Again (1975) as Beth Foster
A Piece of the Action (1977) as Lila French
Capricorn One (1977) as Betty Walker
Marvin & Tige (1983) as Vanessa Jackson
Over Here, Mr. President (1983) as Joyce Proctor
Mother's Day (1989) as Elizabeth Sturgis
Ghost Dad (1990) as Joan
Ritual (2002) as Sylvia and Mother
Proud (2004) as Gordon's Mother
Mr. Fantastic & The Wonderful Depot (2015) as Charlotte Bulivar

Television
It Takes a Thief (1968) as Toosdhi
The F.B.I. (1969) as Nora Tobin
N.Y.P.D. (1967–69) as Ethel and Mrs. Ward
The Flip Wilson Show (1970) as Herself
Five Desperate Women (1971 TV movie) as Joy
Night Gallery  episode "Logoda's Heads" (broadcast December 29, 1971)  (1971) as Kyro
Love, American Style (1972)
Room 222 (1969–74) as Liz McIntyre
Police Story (1975) as Candy Priest
Rhoda (1975) as Denise Culp
Marcus Welby, M.D. (1975) as Myrna Kelland
Baby, I'm Back (1978) as Olivia Ellis
The Paper Chase (1979) as Donna Scott
The Love Boat (1980–82) as Maura Belloque and Jenny Brooks
Benson (1980) as Carol Walker
Diff'rent Strokes (1980) as Sondra Williams
Secrets of Midland Heights (1981) as Julie Hammond
Aloha Paradise (1981) as Carrie
Jacqueline Susann's Valley of the Dolls (1981 miniseries) as Connie
One Day at a Time (1983) as Susan Bryant
Masquerade (1983) as Sheila Walters
Magnum, P.I. (1983) as T.C's Date
Hotel (1987) as Mrs. Blake
227 (1988) as Jeanie Smith
Amen (1988) as Mrs. Kirby
In the Heat of the Night (1989–95) as Harriet DeLong Gillespie
The Cosby Show (1989) as Lorraine
A Different World (1990) as Carol Garrison
B.L. Stryker (1990) as Darlene Carter
Hangin' with Mr. Cooper (1992) as Mrs. Walker
The Parent 'Hood (1995) as Miss Hicks
Living Single (1997) as Lilah James
My Wife and Kids (2001) as Ann Kyle

Theatre

References

External links

 Whatever Happened To: Denise Nicholas

1944 births
Activists for African-American civil rights
History of civil rights in the United States
Living people
People from Milan, Michigan
Actresses from Detroit
USC School of Dramatic Arts alumni
20th-century American actresses
21st-century American actresses
American television actresses
African-American actresses
American film actresses
20th-century African-American women singers
American musical theatre actresses
University of Michigan College of Literature, Science, and the Arts alumni
Tulane University alumni
21st-century African-American women
21st-century African-American people